Olivia "Babsy" Grange  (born 27 April 1946) is a Jamaican politician. She has served as Member of Parliament for Saint Catherine Central since 1997 and as Jamaica's Minister of Sports, Youth and Culture for the duration of the Jamaica Labour Party government from 2007 to 2011 and Minister of Culture, Gender, Entertainment and Sport since 2016.

Early life
Grange was born on 27 April 1946 in Luke Lane, West Kingston, Jamaica. Her father was a shoemaker and her mother was a dressmaker. She attended All Saints Primary, Gainstead High, and Ryerson Polytechnical Institute in Canada.

Career
From 1983 to 1985, Grange served as Government Senator and Parliamentary Secretary for Information and Culture. From 1985 to 1989, she was the Minister of State in the Office of the Prime Minister. Running as a Jamaica Labour Party (JLP) candidate for St. Catherine Central, Grange was elected into parliament in 1997. In 2007, she was appointed as Minister of Information, Youth, Sports & Culture. She is currently the Minister of Sports, Culture, Entertainment and Gender Affairs after the JLP was elected to office in 2016. A reggae enthusiast, Grange is also a founding member of the Jamaica Association of Composers, Authors and Publishers (JACAP). She also co-founded Canada's "first black community newspaper", Contrast.

Personal life
Grange has one daughter and three granddaughters.

Recognition
In 1997, Grange was nominated as Woman of the Year in Jamaica. In June 2009, she was named as the Caribbean Community's first Champion for Culture. In 2015, Grange was awarded the rank of Commander (CD) in the Order of Distinction for her contributions to the country's music scene and cultural development. In her capacity as the Gender Minister of Jamaica, she was presented with the annual DUSUSU Awards in 2019 for her contribution to the development of girls affairs in Jamaica, especially tackling the issue of teenage pregnancy. The annual award founded by Girl Education advocate and Film maker - Zuriel Oduwole, recognizes the work of a First Lady and a Gender Minister across the 54 African countries and their diaspora. Olivia Grange became the first recipient of the award, outside of the African continent

See also
 Women in the House of Representatives of Jamaica

References

1946 births
Living people
Toronto Metropolitan University alumni
Government ministers of Jamaica
Members of the House of Representatives of Jamaica
Women government ministers of Jamaica
21st-century Jamaican women politicians
21st-century Jamaican politicians
20th-century Jamaican women politicians
20th-century Jamaican politicians
Jamaica Labour Party politicians
Members of the 12th Parliament of Jamaica
Members of the 13th Parliament of Jamaica
Members of the 14th Parliament of Jamaica